Cooper Coyle and Luca Coyle (born July 19, 1998), better known by their respective stage names Sugar and Spice, are a sibling duo of American drag performers originally from Long Island, New York. They are best known for their presence on TikTok as well as being individual contestants on the fifteenth season of RuPaul's Drag Race.

Early life 
Cooper and Luca Coyle were raised on Long Island, New York.

Drag career 
Sugar and Spice first gained prominence on Vine as teenagers. On TikTok, the duo had more than 3.8 million followers by early 2021 and 7.4 million followers by 2023.

RuPaul's Drag Race 
Sugar and Spice competed on the fifteenth season of RuPaul's Drag Race, which premiered in January 2023. They are the show's first sibling contestants. During the Snatch Game challenge, Sugar impersonated Trisha Paytas and Spice portrayed Miley Cyrus. The duo performed a synchronized lip sync to Pat Benatar's "You Better Run", before Sugar was eliminated. Charlie Grey of Queerty wrote, "We knew the Sugar x Spice lipsync was destined to happen from the moment they were cast on the show together, and they did not disappoint. The pair put on a show complete with choreo, bits, and entirely too much fun — a perfect encapsulation of Sugar's run on this season." Sugar and Spice finished in 14th place and 9th place, respectively.

Personal life 
Both Cooper and Luca are gay. The twins came out to their mother online. In 2022, they relocated from Long Island to the greater Los Angeles area.

Filmography

Television

Web series

See also 

 List of Long Islanders

References 

Living people
American drag queens
American identical twins
American TikTokers
Duos
Gay entertainers
Identical twin males
LGBT people from California
LGBT people from New York (state)
LGBT TikTokers
People from Greater Los Angeles
People from Long Island
RuPaul's Drag Race contestants
Year of birth missing (living people)